The National LGBT Cancer Network (formerly called "The LGBT Cancer Project") is a nonprofit organization launched in September 2007. It is one of the first programs in the United States that addresses the needs of lesbian, gay, bisexual and transgender (LGBT) cancer survivors and those at risk and the only one founded and directed by members of the LGBT community. The Network was founded by Liz Margolies, LCSW.

Establishment
There are a number of local lesbian cancer programs and one national lesbian health organization, Mautner Project.  The National LGBT Cancer Network contains an online cancer screening and referral program, entitled "Take Care of That Body",  original articles on cancer risks and survivorship experiences of the LGBT community, and links to resources for both LGBT people and health professionals.

The Network's goals are
Educating LGBT people about their increased cancer risks and the importance of screening/early detection
Training healthcare providers to offer more culturally competent.safe and welcoming care to LGBT patients
Advocating for LGBT inclusion in national cancer organizations, research and the media.

Recent work with the NYC Health and Hospitals Corporation
In 2010, the National LGBT Cancer Network was selected to develop an LGBT cultural competence in healthcare curriculum that became mandatory for all 38,000 employees of the municipal hospital system .

Cancer In The LGBT Community
Lesbians, gay men and transgender men and women experience disparities in availability of health insurance and are considered to be at increased risk for multiple types of cancer, based on behaviors such as high smoking and drinking rates, high fat diet, receptive anal intercourse and positive HIV status. Increased risks are coupled with decreased screening behaviors, resulting in cancers being detected at a later stage when it is more difficult to treat.  Decreased screening is linked to lower insurance rates and perceived homophobia in health care. LGBT people experience extra challenges in cancer survivorship, including acceptance of their families by oncologists and emergency rooms and information about the effect of treatment on sexuality, relationships and fertility.

See also

List of LGBT medical organizations

References

External links
 The National LGBT Cancer Network homepage

LGBT health organizations in the United States
Medical and health organizations based in New York (state)
Cancer organizations based in the United States